Bret Brielmaier (born November 28, 1985) is an American professional basketball coach who currently is an assistant coach for the Orlando Magic of the National Basketball Association (NBA).

He was raised in Mankato, Minnesota, and attended Loyola Catholic School. Brielmaier played college basketball for the Arizona Wildcats from 2004 to 2008 in primarily a reserve role. He began his coaching career as an undergraduate assistant for interim Wildcats head coach Russ Pennell during the 2008–09 season. Brielmaier joined the San Antonio Spurs of the NBA as a workout coach in 2009 and was promoted to a video coordinator in 2010. He joined the Cleveland Cavaliers as an assistant coach in 2013 and won an NBA championship with the Cavaliers in 2016.

Brielmaier was hired by the Brooklyn Nets as an assistant coach in 2016. In 2020, he was named the head coach of the Nets' NBA G League affiliate, the Long Island Nets. He was replaced as the Long Island Nets coach after one season and a 7–8 record.

On August 8, 2021, Brielmaier was hired by the Orlando Magic as an assistant coach.

References

External links
 College statistics

1985 births
Living people
American men's basketball coaches
American men's basketball players
Arizona Wildcats men's basketball players
Basketball coaches from Minnesota
Basketball players from Minnesota
Brooklyn Nets assistant coaches
Cleveland Cavaliers assistant coaches
Forwards (basketball)
Sportspeople from Mankato, Minnesota